Tony Bennett Celebrates 90 is an album by Tony Bennett, released by Columbia Records on December 16, 2016. Guest artists include Andrea Bocelli, Michael Bublé, Billy Joel, Elton John, Diana Krall, Lady Gaga, k.d. lang, Leslie Odom Jr., Kevin Spacey, Rufus Wainwright, and Stevie Wonder. The record won the Grammy Award for Best Traditional Pop Vocal Album at the 60th Grammy Awards.

Follow-up special
The album was followed by the television special Tony Bennett Celebrates 90: The Best Is Yet to Come, which aired on NBC on December 20, 2016. The special included appearances by Alec Baldwin, Steve Buscemi, Robert De Niro, John McEnroe, Wynton Marsalis, and Bruce Willis. It was executive produced by Danny Bennett, directed by Jerry Foley, with production and lighting design by LeRoy Bennett.

Track listing

Charts

References

External links
 Tony Bennett Celebrates 90 at NBC.com

2016 live albums
Columbia Records live albums
Grammy Award for Best Traditional Pop Vocal Album
Tony Bennett live albums